Al Dodd (August 21, 1945 - April 9, 1987) was a professional American football player who played as a wide receiver and cornerback for six seasons for the Chicago Bears, New Orleans Saints, and Atlanta Falcons.

1945 births
Players of American football from New Orleans
American football wide receivers
American football cornerbacks
Northwestern State Demons football players
Chicago Bears players
New Orleans Saints players
Atlanta Falcons players
1987 deaths
Place of death missing